In 2011, the foremost athletics event was the 2011 World Championships in Athletics in Daegu. The other major global level competition held in 2011 was the World Cross Country Championships.

The 2011 season marked the re-establishment of the African Cross Country Championships, an event created in response to the change of the World Cross Championships from an annual to a biennial format. It was also the first year since 1992 that the IAAF World Half Marathon Championships was not held, as that competition also switched to a two-year schedule.

Major events

World

World Championships in Athletics
World Cross Country Championships
IAAF Diamond League
World Youth Championships in Athletics
IPC Athletics World Championships
World Student Games
Military World Games

Regional

CAC Championships
NACAC Cross Country Championships
Pan American Games
Pan American Junior Championships
South American Championships
South American Cross Country Championships
European Indoor Championships
European Cross Country Championships
European Team Championships
European U23 Championships
European Junior Championships
European Youth Olympic Festival
Commonwealth Youth Games
Asian Championships
Pan Arab Games
Southeast Asian Games
All-Africa Games
African Junior Championships
African Cross Country Championships

National

World records

Men

Women

Season's bests

† = Russia's Anastasiya Kapachinskaya ran 49.35 in July in at the Russian National Championships in Cheboksary, but this was annulled after she later failed a drug test.
† = Russia's Mariya Abakumova threw 71.99, a championship record, at the 2011 World Championships in Athletics, but this was annulled after she later failed a drug test.
† = Croatia's Sandra Perković had a throw of 69.99 m in June in Varaždin, but this was annulled after she later failed a drug test.
† = Russia's Tatyana Chernova accumulated 6880 points at the 2011 World Championships in Athletics, but this was annulled after she later failed a drug test.

Awards

Men

Women

Deaths

 3 January – Zbigniew Jaremski (61), 400 m relay silver medallist at the 1976 Olympics
 16 January – Stefka Yordanova (64), 1973 European indoor champion over 800 m
3 February – Robert Young (95), 400 m relay silver medallist at the 1936 Olympics
5 February – Albert Yator (17), Kenyan world junior steeplechase medalist
13 February – Inese Jaunzeme (78), javelin thrower and Latvia's first Olympic champion
19 February – Ollie Matson (70), 400 m runner and 1952 Olympic medallist
25 February – Peter Hildreth (82), 1950 European Championships medallist in the hurdles
14 March – Eduard Gushchin (60), 1968 Olympic medallist in the shot put 
19 April – Grete Waitz (57), distance runner and world champion and record holder in the marathon
16 May – Samuel Wanjiru (24), first Kenyan to win the Olympic marathon and a former half marathon world record holder
 28 May – Romuald Klim (78), 1964 Olympic champion and former world record holder in the hammer throw
30 May - Ricky Bruch, (64) former world record holder in the discus throw
6 June – Benjamín González (53), World and European indoor medallist over 400 and 800 metres
10 June – Cosimo Caliandro (29), 3000 metres gold medallist at the 2007 European Indoors
10 July – Ragnar Lundberg (86), pole vaulter and 1950 European champion
12 July – Kurt Lundquist (85), 400 m runner and 1948 Olympic relay medallist
17 August – Pierre Quinon (49), 1984 Olympic pole vault champion
2 October – Vera Popkova (68), 1971 European indoor champion over 400 metres
13 October – Abdoulaye Seye (77), sprinter and 1960 Olympic medallist over 200 m
12 December – Sunday Bada (42), 1997 World indoor champion over 400 metres and Olympic relay gold medallist

References

Further reading
Annual season reviews from IAAF by A. Lennart Julin and Mirko Jalava:

Sprints
Middle-distances
Long-distance (track)

Road running and race walking
Hurdles

Jumps
Throws
Combined events

Athletics
Athletics (track and field) by year